El Pampero is a live album by Argentinian jazz composer and saxophonist Gato Barbieri featuring performances recorded at the Montreux Jazz Festival in 1971 and first released on the Flying Dutchman label.

Reception

The Allmusic site awarded the album 4 stars stating "Gato Barbieri leads his fantastic group of musical friends with hurricane-like flair on his tenor sax. At times surreal and mind-boggling, Barbieri shows just how far one can let the music go to break the borders of jazz, sending his music into fresh and uncharted territory".

Track listing
 "El Pampero" - 13:44
 "Mi Buenos Aires Querido" (Carlos Gardel, Alfredo Le Pera) - 6:21
 "Brasil" (Aldo Cabral, Benedito Lacerda, Pedro Berrios) - 9:36 	
 "El Arriero" (Atahualpa Yupanqui) - 11:59

Personnel
Gato Barbieri - tenor saxophone, arranger
Lonnie Liston Smith - piano
Chuck Rainey - electric bass
Bernard Purdie - drums
Sonny Morgan - congas
Naná Vasconcelos - berimbau, percussion

References

1971 live albums
Albums produced by Bob Thiele
Flying Dutchman Records live albums
Gato Barbieri live albums